The 1987–88 NBA season was the Warriors' 42nd season in the NBA and 25th in the San Francisco Bay Area. Head coach George Karl resigned with 18 games left, and Ed Gregory was interim head coach for the rest of the season. The Warriors finished fifth in the Pacific Division with a disappointing 20-62 record.

Draft picks

Roster

Regular season

Season standings

z - clinched division title
y - clinched division title
x - clinched playoff spot

Record vs. opponents

Game log

Regular season

|-style="background:#fcc;"
| 6
| November 14, 19877:30 pm PST
| L.A. Lakers
| L 110–118
|
|
|
| Oakland-Alameda County Coliseum Arena15,025
| 1–5
|-style="background:#fcc;"
| 9
| November 20, 19874:30 pm PST
| @ Detroit
| L 108–131
|
|
|
| Pontiac Silverdome20,362
| 1–8

|-style="background:#fcc;"
| 19
| December 17, 19877:30 pm PST
| L.A. Lakers
| L 106–113
|
|
|
| Oakland-Alameda County Coliseum Arena15,025
| 3–16

|-style="background:#fcc;"
| 29
| January 12, 19887:30 pm PST
| @ L.A. Lakers
| L 113–117
|
|
|
| The Forum17,505
| 5–24

|-style="background:#fcc;"
| 50
| February 24, 19887:30 pm PST
| Detroit
| L 93–107
|
|
|
| Oakland-Alameda County Coliseum Arena14,340
| 14–36

|-style="background:#fcc;"
| 55
| March 4, 19887:30 pm PST
| @ L.A. Lakers
| L 107–120
|
|
|
| The Forum17,505
| 14–41
|-style="background:#fcc;"
| 64
| March 20, 19887:30 pm PST
| L.A. Lakers
| L 106–113
|
|
|
| Oakland-Alameda County Coliseum Arena15,025
| 16–48

|-style="background:#fcc;"
| 82
| April 24, 198812:30 pm PDT
| @ L.A. Lakers
| L 100–136
|
|
|
| The Forum17,505
| 20–62

Player statistics

Awards and records

None

References

None

See also
 1987-88 NBA season

Golden State Warriors seasons
Golden
Golden
Golden State